XEIT-AM/XHIT-FM is an AM-FM combo radio station in Ciudad del Carmen, Campeche, Mexico, broadcasting on 1070 AM and 99.7 FM. It is operated by Organización Radio Carmen and carries the Exa FM pop format from MVS Radio and is owned 50 percent by members of the Boeta family and 50% by Grupo Radiorama.

History
XEIT came to air in January 1962 as the first radio station in Carmen. Mario Antonio Boeta Blanco, who would later start XEMAB-XHMAB radio and become mayor of the city in the mid-1970s, helped to establish XEIT; Boeta Blanco and other family members continue to own half of the station, with the remaining shares held by members of the founding families of Radiorama.

The station became an AM/FM combo in 1994, as part of the first wave of AM/FM combo stations in various regions of Mexico. The concession transferred from Radio Carmen, S. de R.L., to the current concessionaire in 2015.

References

1962 establishments in Mexico
Radio stations established in 1962
Radio stations in Campeche
Spanish-language radio stations
Contemporary hit radio stations in Mexico